Luo Pei-ying (12 August 1960 – 3 August 2020), formerly known as Luo Pi-ling, was a Taiwanese television personality, actress and businesswoman.

Luo was born on 12 August 1960 in Keelung. She began her career as an actress, appearing in a 1980 Chinese Television System drama. She later became known for her comedic and outspoken style on variety and talk shows, such as Kangsi Coming. Until 2005, Luo used the stage name Luo Pi-ling.

Luo was discovered dead at her home in Taipei on 3 August 2020, after friends were unable to contact her. Blood toxicology results determined her cause of death to be accidental overdose from heart and antidepressive medications, and has ruled out suicide.

References

External links 

 
 

20th-century Taiwanese actresses
Taiwanese television actresses
Taiwanese film actresses
1960 births
2020 deaths
Actresses from Keelung
21st-century Taiwanese actresses
Taiwanese women in business
Taiwanese television personalities
Taiwanese television presenters
Taiwanese women television presenters